Vi hade i alla fall tur med vädret ("We were at least lucky with the weather") is a Swedish TV comedy film directed by Kjell Sundvall. It originally aired over SVT on 27 February 1980. In 2008 it was followed by the film Vi hade i alla fall tur med vädret – igen.

Plot
The family Backlund are going on travel trailer vacation. But Gösta doesn't like that Rudolf, the children's grandpa, has 
been promised to follow them. During the vacation there is always an incident after the other.

Selected cast
Rolf Skoglund as Gösta Backlund
Claire Wikholm as Gun Backlund
Charlotte Thomsen as Lotta Backlund
Johan Öhman as Johan Backlund
Gunnar Lindkvist as Rudolf, grandpa (Gun's father)
Rune Pettersson as motorcycle-policeman

Home video
The film was released to home video in 1983.

References

External links
 
 

1980 television films
1980 films
Swedish comedy films
Swedish television films
Films directed by Kjell Sundvall
Films about vacationing
1980s Swedish films